Conexión were a seminal Spanish soul-jazz-rock band active 1969-1974. Influenced by American bands such as Blood, Sweat & Tears and Chicago Transit Authority, their best known singles were "I will pray" (1969), "Strong lover" (1969),  "Un mundo sin amor" (1970), and "Preparad los caminos del señor" (1972) a Spanish cover from Godspell.

Discography
Conexión,	Movieplay		1971		
Harmony,	Movieplay		1973

References

Spanish musical groups